Vice Admiral Aart Malherbe  is a retired South African Navy officer who served as Chief of Staff Logistics  before his retirement in 1995.

Naval career 
He was promoted to vice admiral in 1991.

Awards and decorations 
He was awarded the Star of South Africa, Silver in the 1994 National Honours.

References

South African admirals
Possibly living people
Year of birth missing